The 1983 Arkansas Razorbacks football team represented the University of Arkansas during the 1983 NCAA Division I-A football season. Ron Faurot received first-team All-American honors as a defensive lineman for the Hogs.

After the season in mid-December, Arkansas athletic director Frank Broyles asked Lou Holtz to resign after seven years as head coach, partly because of the team's decline, but also due to political statements made by Holtz earlier in the year. Holtz decided to resign rather than be fired, and went to Minnesota. Arkansas soon hired Air Force head coach Ken Hatfield, an alumnus who shined for the Hogs as a defensive back on the 1964 national championship team.

Schedule

Roster
QB Brad Taylor

References

Arkansas
Arkansas Razorbacks football seasons
Arkansas Razorbacks football